Commandant Eric Lassard is a fictional character in the 1984 film Police Academy, as well as its six sequels. He was portrayed by George Gaynes.

Character arc 
Commandant Lassard is introduced as head of the Metropolitan Police Academy (sometimes also called the Midcity Police Academy). Unlike many of his colleagues in administration, he is never politically reactionary in response to changes in the police force or changes to his academy, although he appears uninterested in police politics in general. When Police Chief Henry J. Hurst and Lieutenant Thaddeus Harris are denouncing the new female mayor's policy change to remove race and gender as barriers to academy admissions, he plays along with them. After they leave, he quickly dismisses their comments, and he is the only one shown to oppose Hurst and Harris's plans to weed out the new cadets. After Lassard's first successful run with the new recruits, Police Chief Hurst changes his outlook and realizes that Lassard was right in giving them a chance. In Police Academy 4: Citizens on Patrol, however, he initiated a program known as Citizens on Patrol (COP), which is a community outreach course.

Lassard is portrayed as being fond of his job, proud of the academy, and supportive of his cadets. He is also comically odd: he is rarely seen without his pet goldfish; frequently travels by golf cart; and is prone to accidentally destroying things (similar to fellow officer Sgt. Douglas Fackler), e.g., by playing golf inside his office. He can sometime be absent-minded, and a running joke in the series is that he becomes so lost in thought that he is carried away—usually figuratively, as in his signature repetition of the words "many" and "very" (e.g., "Have a very, very, very good day," or "This is very, very... very bad"), but sometimes literally, as when he starts to pace while giving a speech and wanders far from his audience. Lassard is an astounding trick shot at billiards, once clearing an entire pool table in a single shot, much to the astonishment of the local bar players.

Lassard nearly loses his job three times in the series. In Police Academy 3: Back in Training, the Metropolitan Police Academy, now a semi-statewide institution, is pitted against the state's other police academy in a competition to decide which school will survive budget cuts.  In Police Academy 5: Assignment Miami Beach, Lassard reaches the mandatory retirement age.  This is brought to his superiors' attention by Captain Harris, and Lassard's retirement is announced to the surprise of everyone (including himself) at the subsequent graduation ceremony.  He flies with his contingent to Miami Beach, Florida to be honored as Police Officer of the Decade at the National Police Chiefs' Convention.  While in Miami, he inadvertently foils a jewel thief's escape, earning him and his men and women medals from the city.  As a result, back in his home state, his superiors waive his mandatory retirement and allow him to continue to serve as long as he wishes.  His age seems to be approximately 70 years old.  In Police Academy 6: City Under Siege, the criminal mastermind who has begun to seize control of the city attempts to frame Lassard for a jewel heist by planting stolen jewelry in his desk at the Oakdale Station, where he has been leading a task force.  As a result, Lassard is suspended from active duty, until Nick and Hightower prove that he is innocent (and that Harris had been leaking information to the thieves to keep them ahead of the police and humiliate Lassard and his men).

Comdt. Lassard's family consists mainly of his wife, seen briefly during the first movie and never named, and a younger brother, Captain Pete Lassard (played by Howard Hesseman), whose precinct has a horrendous crime rate until the fresh graduates from Comdt. Lassard's academy bring down an enormous gang.  A nephew (possibly Pete's son), Nick Lassard, is with the Miami Police but leaves to join Eric in Police Academy 6.

Lassard has other nephews in the animated series.

References 

Police Academy (franchise)
Lassard, Eric
Film characters introduced in 1984
Comedy film characters
Male characters in film